The Middletown Township Public School District is a comprehensive community public school district that serves students from pre-kindergarten through twelfth grade from Middletown Township in Monmouth County, New Jersey, United States.

As of the 2018–19 school year, the district, comprised of 17 schools, had an enrollment of 9,617 students and 792.1 classroom teachers (on an FTE basis), for a student–teacher ratio of 12.1:1.

The district is classified by the New Jersey Department of Education as being in District Factor Group "GH", the third-highest of eight groupings. District Factor Groups organize districts statewide to allow comparison by common socioeconomic characteristics of the local districts. From lowest socioeconomic status to highest, the categories are A, B, CD, DE, FG, GH, I and J.

History
In 1948 the schools were racially integrated and all of the teachers were white.

Schools
The district consists of twelve K-5 elementary schools, three middle schools for grades 6–8, and two four-year high schools. Four elementary schools feed into each of the three middle schools. The facilities vary in age, architecture, size, and student population. Schools in the district (with 2018–19 enrollment data from the National Center for Education Statistics) are:
Elementary schools
Bayview Elementary School (366 students in grades K-5)
Tara Raspanti, Principal
Fairview Elementary School (295; PreK-5)
Michael Melando, Principal
Harmony Elementary School (507; PreK-5)
Erin Paulson, Principal
Leonardo Elementary School (274; K-5)
Peter Smith, Principal
Lincroft Elementary School (450; K-5)
Daniel Imbimbo, Principal
Middletown Village Elementary School (384; K-5)
Maureen McCormack, Principal
Navesink Elementary School (233; K-5)
Kevin Cullen, Principal
New Monmouth Elementary School (367; PreK-5)
Matthew Ferri, Principal
Nut Swamp Elementary School (572; K-5)
Neil Leone, Principal
Ocean Avenue Elementary School (294; K-5)
Cynthia C. Wilson, Principal
River Plaza Elementary School (286; K-5)
David Whitman, Principal
Middle schools
Bayshore Middle School (626; 6–8)
Thomas Baxter, Interim Principal
Thompson Middle School (1,005; 6–8)
Brian Currie, Principal
Thorne Middle School (677; 6–8)
Shannon Smith, Principal
High schools
Middletown High School North (1,449; 9-12)
Patricia Vari-Cartier, Principal
Middletown High School South (1,565; 9-12)
Thomas J. Olausen, Principal

Drug testing
In October 2006, the Board of Education of the Middletown Township Public School District voted to implement a random drug testing procedure that would require all students in extracurricular activities or with a parking space at either high school to submit their name to a pool for random selection.

Administration
Core district administrators are: 
Mary Ellen Walker, Superintendent
Amy P. Doherty, Business Administrator / Board secretary

Board of education
The district's board of education, comprised of nine members, sets policy and oversees the fiscal and educational operation of the district through its administration. As a Type II school district, the board's trustees are elected directly by voters to serve three-year terms of office on a staggered basis, with three seats up for election each year held (since 2012) as part of the November general election. The board appoints a superintendent to oversee the district's day-to-day operations and a business administrator to supervise the business functions of the district.

Teachers' union
The Middletown Township Education Association (MTEA) is the Middletown Township teachers' union. The organization is Middletown's local NEA, NJEA MCEA office.

The Middletown School District received national attention in the fall of 2001 when its teachers and secretaries went on strike for the second time in three years.  The strike disrupted classes from November 30 to December 7, 2001, and 228 teachers and secretaries were jailed in alphabetical order for violating a court back-to-work order. After the strike, members of the MTEA successfully lobbied to change the state law to prohibit school boards from imposing a contract on their employees (signed into law July 10, 2003). The union, with over 1,200 members, had elected Diane Swaim president since 1983, and re-elected her in May 2007. Swaim retired on January 1, 2008, and was replaced by the First Vice-president, Linda McLaughlin  There has not been a strike since 2001. The union and board of education amicably settled the next contract (July 1, 2004-June 30, 2007) in April 2004, months before the expiration of the old contract. The union and board reached a new contract settlement without acrimony for 2007–2010.

Armed officer in each school 
On May 31, 2022, following the mass shooting in Robb Elementary School in Uvalde, Texas, the school board unanimously voted to have a police officer in each school at the hourly rate of $50 until the end of the 2021-2022 school year. For the 2022-2023 school year, a Class III special law enforcement officer would be at every school in the District, at an hourly rate not to exceed $35.

References

External links
Middletown Township Public School District

School Data for the Middletown Township Public School District, National Center for Education Statistics
Middletown Township Education Association

Middletown Township, New Jersey
New Jersey District Factor Group GH
School districts in Monmouth County, New Jersey